The Battle of Inkovo took place on 8 August 1812, between the Cossack corps of General Platov and the 2nd Light Cavalry Division of General Sebastiani and ended as a minor Russian victory.

Prelude
As Barclay de Tolly's and Pyotr Bagration's army were separated, Napoleon tried in vain to defeat them before they could unite. But Barclay de Tolly under political pressure had to attack Napoleon and the Russian offensive began west on the north bank of the Dnieper on 7 August, but relying on a false report Barclay de Tolly abandoned the move west.

Battle
The altered orders had not reached General Platov on his advance and he clashed with General Sebastiani's 2nd Light Cavalry Division near Inkovo. The French were first forced to retreat. Being reinforced the French force then repulsed the pursuing Russians. The fighting ended three miles east of Rudnya in the west of Inkovo.

Aftermath
The battle of Inkovo was a Russian victory. The French casualties were 600 men, including 11 officers and 300 other ranks captured. The Russian offensive had been abandoned, allowing Napoleon to continue his attack on Smolensk.

See also
List of battles of the French invasion of Russia

Notes

References

External links
 

Battles of the French invasion of Russia
Battles of the Napoleonic Wars
Battles involving France
Battles involving Russia
Conflicts in 1812
1812 in France
August 1812 events
History of Smolensk Oblast